The men's national basketball team of the United States won the gold medal at the 2000 Summer Olympics in Sydney, Australia. They defeated France by a score of 85–75 in the gold medal game. Team USA won gold for the 12th time in 14 Olympic basketball tournaments.

Roster 

Head coach: Rudy Tomjanovich (Houston Rockets)
Assistant coach: Larry Brown (Philadelphia 76ers)
Assistant coach: Gene Keady (Purdue University, Ind.)
Assistant coach: Tubby Smith (University of Kentucky)

Withdrawals

Kobe Bryant - the 2000 All-NBA Second Team
Tim Duncan - the 2000 All-NBA First Team
Allen Iverson - the 2000 All-NBA Second Team
Karl Malone - the 2000 All-NBA Second Team
Reggie Miller
Shaquille O'Neal - the 2000 All-NBA First Team
David Robinson - the 2000 All-NBA Third Team
John Stockton - The 50 Greatest Players in National Basketball Association History
Scottie Pippen - the 2000 NBA All-Defensive Second Team
Paul Pierce
Eddie Jones - the 2000 All-NBA Third Team
Steve Francis - the 2000 Co-NBA Rookie of the Year
Chris Webber - the 2000 All-NBA Third Team
Stephon Marbury - the 2000 All-NBA Third Team

Results

 beat , 119–72
 beat , 93–61
 beat , 85–76
 beat , 102–56
 beat , 106–94
 beat , 85–70
 beat , 85–83
 beat , 85–75

In the preliminary round, Team USA was undefeated (5-0), and qualified for the quarterfinals. In the knockout rounds, Team USA faced Russia (quarterfinals), Lithuania (semifinals), and France (gold-medal game).

2000 Olympic Games final standings

1.  (8–0)
2.  (4–4)
3.  (5–3)
4.  (4–4)
5.  (4–3)
6.  FR Yugoslavia (4–3)
7.  (5–2)
8.  (3–4)
9.  (2–4)
10.  (2–4)
11.  (1–5)
12.  (0–6)

References

External links
 USA Basketball, official site

United States at the Olympic men's basketball tournament
United States
Olympics